736 Harvard (prov. designation:  or ) is a stony background asteroid from the inner regions of the asteroid belt, approximately  in diameter. It was discovered on 16 November 1912, by American astronomer Joel Hastings Metcalf at the Winchester Observatory . The bright S-type asteroid has a rotation period of 6.7 hours. It was named after Harvard University in Cambridge, Massachusetts.

Orbit and classification 

Located in the orbital region of the Flora family, Harvard is a non-family asteroid of the main belt's background population when applying the hierarchical clustering method to its proper orbital elements. It orbits the Sun in the inner asteroid belt at a distance of 1.8–2.6 AU once every 3 years and 3 months (1,193 days; semi-major axis of 2.2 AU). Its orbit has an eccentricity of 0.17 and an inclination of 4° with respect to the ecliptic. The body's observation arc begins at Heidelberg Observatory on 9 December 1912, or three weeks after its official discovery observation by Metcalf at Winchester.

Naming 

This minor planet was named in honor of the prestigious Harvard University in Cambridge, Massachusetts, United States. The  was also mentioned in The Names of the Minor Planets by Paul Herget in 1955.

Physical characteristics 

In the Tholen classification, Harvard is a common, stony S-type asteroid.

Rotation period 

In 1970s, a rotational lightcurve of Harvard was obtained from photometric observations by Ed Tedesco. Lightcurve analysis gave a well-defined rotation period of  hours with a brightness variation of  magnitude.

Diameter and albedo 

The Collaborative Asteroid Lightcurve Link derives an albedo of 0.2051 and a diameter of 16.89 kilometers based on an absolute magnitude of 11.2. These timed observations are taken when the asteroid passes in front of a distant star.

References

External links 
 Lightcurve Database Query (LCDB), at www.minorplanet.info
 Dictionary of Minor Planet Names, Google books
 Discovery Circumstances: Numbered Minor Planets (1)-(5000) – Minor Planet Center
 
 

000736
Discoveries by Joel Hastings Metcalf
Named minor planets
736 Harvard
000736
19121116